The battle of Kandalur salai (c. 988 CE), also spelled Kanthaloor salai, was a naval engagement of the Cholas under Rajaraja I (985—1014 CE) against the "salai" at Kandalur in  Trivandrum Kerala. The exact location of Kandalur—somewhere south Kerala—is a subject of scholarly debate. The above (988 CE) event is sometimes assumed to be identical with the "conquest of Vizhinjam by a general of Rajaraja [I]", before the burning of Lanka, given in the Tiruvalangadu Grant/Plates.

The phrase "Kandalur salai kalamarutta" is again used as a title with distinction of three other Chola kings also (Rajendra, Rajadhiraja and Kulottunga).

Assessment of the title 
"Salais" were considered prized possessions as they are claimed to have been sacked by many kings of south India. The character of the salais were re-examined in the 1970 paper 'Kantalur Salai-New Light on Brahmin Expansion in South India' by historian M. G. S. Narayanan.

Older assessments 
Different views were expressed by early scholars regarding the character of "salai" (such as naval base - military training centre - cantonment - ammunition depot).

 Dr. Hultzsch - (1) "built a jewell-like hall at Kandalur" or (2)  "cut the vessel [kalam] in the hall at Kandalur" (3) "destroyed ships [kalam] at Kandalur [harbour]"
 Gopinatha Rao - "destroyed/discontinued/transferred the Brahmin feeding [kalam] at Kandalur Feeding House or Hall [salai] "
 Desikavinayakam Pillai - "regulation of the Brahmin feeding at Kandalur Feeding House [salai]"
K. A. N. Sastri - "destroyed ships at Kandalur [harbour]"
 Elamkulam P. N. Kunjan Pillai - "discontinued/destroyed the feeding [kalam] of the armed Brahmins [Chathar] at Kandalur".

Location of Kandalur salai 
The exact location of Kandalur is a subject of scholarly debate. It is possible the original Kandalur salai was located near the Ay headquarters Vizhinjam and the deity was later shifted to Trivandrum (after the Chola raids of the 10th-11th centuries).

 Original location:— a village around 20 km east of Vizhinjam with a Shiva temple called Kandalur Salai.
 Shifted location:— within the city of Trivandrum (Valiya Salai Temple)

Raid by Rajaraja I (c. 988 CE) 
As per historian K. A. Nilakanta Sastri, the capture was the first military achievement of king Rajaraja's reign. The success was summed up in the famous phrase "Kandalur salai kalamarutta", which precedes Rajaraja's name in several of his inscriptions from the 4th regnal year (988 CE) onwards.

 The Kandalur salai belonged to the Ay chief, a vassal of the Pandya king at Madurai, in the mid-860s (865 CE).
It is possible that at the time of the raid, the salai may have been under control of the Chera Perumal king of Kerala, Bhaskara Ravi. If that was the case, the campaign can be viewed as part of Rajaraja's early battles against the Cheras, Pandyas and the rulers of Sri Lanka.
 However, some historians argue that Kandalur salai, which only later Chola inscriptions (1048 CE) claim to have belonged to the Chera Perumals, may have been held by the Pandyas when it was attacked by Rajaraja I.
A hero stone inscription was unearthed from a village near Tiruvannamalai in November, 2009. It supports the view that a military engagement indeed took place at Kandalur. It has a eulogy that talks about Rajaraja "beheading the Malai Alargal of Kandalur Salai".

References to Kandalur salai 
Corrections by M. G. S. Narayanan on K. A. Nilakanta Sastri are employed.

 865 CE — Huzur Office/Parthivapuram Plates of Ay chieftain Karunantatakkan Srivallabha (a vassal of the Pandya king Srimara Srivallabha).
 988 CE — first Chola reference to the fall of Kandalur salai ("Kandalur salai kalamarutta").
 1018-19 CE — Chola (Rajadhiraja and Rajendra) campaigns in Kerala.

 1048 CE – Velur and Tiruppangili inscriptions – Kandalur salai is mentioned as 'Cheralan Velaikkelu Kantalur Chalai'.
 Kalingattupparani (III-21) mentions Kulottunga Chola's victory of over the Bow Emblem and the Chola capture of Kantalur Salai.
 c. 1102 — c.1118 CE – Jatavarman Parakrama Pandya mentions the capture of Kantalur Salai (for his Chola overlord Vikrama Chola).

References

988
10th century in India
History of Kerala
Kandalur Salai
Naval history of India
Chera dynasty
Kandalur Salai
Military orders (monastic society)